The Woman Conquers is a 1922 American silent drama film written by Violet Clark and directed by Tom Forman. It starred Katherine MacDonald and Bryant Washburn and featured a young Boris Karloff.  The film is considered lost.

Plot
Young society beauty Ninon Le Compte (MacDonald) deplores the lack of energy and physical fiber among the men of her acquaintance, including Frederick Van Court (Washburn), who regularly proposes marriage to her. Her uncle's death leaves Ninon the owner of a fur trading settlement in the Hudson Bay country. She decides to go there and is accompanied by her friend Flora O'Hare (Elvidge) and Frederick.

Arriving at the post, she finds Lazar (Lewis), the Canadian in charge, is a dangerous man who covets the estate and also evinces a desire to possess her. Ninon also learns that Lazar is wanted by the police for murder and threatens his exposure unless he leaves the settlement within 24 hours. Lazar leaves, but before he goes, he burns down the warehouse.

Ninon, accompanied by Frederick and an Indian guide Lawatha (McDonald), set out by dogsled to notify the police. Overtaken by a blizzard, they are forced to seek refuge in a cabin in which Lazard is already sheltering. Lazard attacks Ninon and Frederick comes to her aid, but is badly injured. Just as he is about to succumb, Lawatha joins the struggle. Lazar fatally stabs the Indian guide, but as he dies, Lawatha manages to shoot and kill the renegade.

Ninon and Frederick struggle back to safety through the snow, the young woman bringing her injured lover triumphantly home. She realizes that Frederick is her idea of a real man and she agrees to marry him.

Cast
 Katherine MacDonald as Ninon Le Compte
 Bryant Washburn as Frederick Van Court III
 Mitchell Lewis as Lazar
 Francis McDonald as Lawatha, Indian Guide
 June Elvidge as Flora O'Hare
 Clarissa Selwynne as Jeanette Duval
 Boris Karloff as Raoul Maris

See also
 Boris Karloff filmography

References

External links

1922 films
1922 drama films
American silent feature films
American black-and-white films
Silent American drama films
Films directed by Tom Forman
Films produced by B. P. Schulberg
Lost American films
1922 lost films
Lost drama films
Preferred Pictures films
1920s American films